Gangway was San Francisco's oldest continuously operating gay bar, opened in 1910 and started catering to a gay clientele by 1960. It closed in 2018.

References

2018 disestablishments in California
LGBT drinking establishments in California
LGBT history in San Francisco
Defunct LGBT drinking establishments in the United States